The 1917 Mississippi College Collegians football team was an American football team that represented Mississippi College as a member of the Southern Intercollegiate Athletic Association (SIAA) during the 1917 college football season. In their first year under head coach W. A. Robinson, the team compiled a 0–5 record.

Schedule

References

Mississippi College
Mississippi College Choctaws football seasons
College football winless seasons
Mississippi College Collegians football